Massis (in Armenian Մասիս) is a Lebanese-Armenian publication published by the Armenian Catholic Patriarchate in Lebanon.

History and profile
Massis was established in 1947 by Cardinal Gregorio Pietro Agagianian in Beirut. A long-serving editor of the publication was Father Antranik Granian. It stopped publication temporarily in the 1990s and restarted in 2005, with Sarkis Najarian as editor in chief. 

Massis is a religious, political, social and cultural periodical published with varying frequencies (weekly, bi-weekly, monthly) and at times as a tabloid newspaper and as a magazine. 

Presently it is published on a monthly basis (12 issues per year), sometimes, with two months in one combined issue, with pages varying between 48 and 60 magazine-size pages.

See also
 List of magazines in Lebanon
 Avedik
 Armenian Catholic Church

References

External links
Official website
Armenian Catholic website: Massis page

1947 establishments in Lebanon
Armenian-language magazines
Armenian-language mass media in Lebanon
Cultural magazines
Magazines established in 1947
Magazines published in Beirut
Monthly magazines published in Lebanon
Political magazines
Religious magazines